The 2006 Indy Racing League Indy Pro Series was the fifth season of the developmental open-wheel racing series. It was the first season to include double-header races on road and street courses. The season began at the Homestead-Miami Speedway on March 26 and finished September 9 at Chicagoland Speedway.

English rookie Jay Howard, driving for Sam Schmidt Motorsports narrowly won the championship by four points over American rookie Jonathan Klein of Andretti Green Racing. Defending series champion Wade Cunningham, driving for Brian Stewart Racing, finished third in points despite missing two races due to an appendix removal, with a better points per race ratio than Howard and Klein. Rookie Alex Lloyd won two races, but missed three due to funding issues and finished seventh in points. Brazilian rookie Raphael Matos swept the race weekend at St. Petersburg, his first two series starts. Graham Rahal made his only Indy Pro Series start at the Liberty Challenge getting the pole position and coming close to winning the race.

41 different drivers competed in a race but only six started all twelve races.

Drivers and teams 
All teams competed in Firestone-shod Dallaras.

Race Summaries

Miami 100
 Date: March 26
 Location: Homestead-Miami Speedway
 Time of Race: 36 Minutes 41 Second
 Average Speed: 
 Margin of Victory: 0.0199 of a Second
 Pole Winner: Jay Howard 

Top 5 Results
 Jeff Simmons
 Nick Bussell
 Jay Howard
 Arie Luyendyk Jr.
 Bobby Wilson

Streets of St. Petersburg 1
 Date: April 1
 Location: Streets of St. Petersburg
 Time of Race: 52 Minutes
 Average Speed: 
 Margin of Victory: 0.5075 of a sec.
 Pole Winner: Raphael Matos 

Top 5 Results
 Raphael Matos
 Jeff Simmons
 Jay Howard
 Nick Bussell
 Jonathan Klein

Streets of St. Petersburg 2
 Date: April 2
 Location: Streets of St. Petersburg
 Time of Race: 50 Minutes 32 Seconds
 Average Speed: 
 Margin of Victory: 5.7206 Seconds
 Pole Winner: Chris Festa

Top 5 Results
 Raphael Matos
 Jay Howard
 Alex Lloyd
 Jeff Simmons
 Jonathan Klein

Freedom 100
 Date: May 26
 Location: Indianapolis Motor Speedway
 Time of Race: 32 Minutes 29 Seconds
 Average Speed: 
 Margin of Victory: 0.6889 of a sec.
 Pole Winner: Wade Cunningham 

Top 5 Results
 Wade Cunningham
 Jay Howard
 Jaime Camara
 Chris Festa
 Alex Lloyd

Corning 100
 Date: June 4
 Location:  Watkins Glen International
 Time of Race: 1 Hour, 10 Minutes, 23 Seconds
 Average Speed: 
 Margin of Victory: 3.2795 seconds
 Pole Winner: Bobby Wilson 

Top 5 Results
 Bobby Wilson
 Wade Cunningham
 Phil Giebler
 Jaime Camara
 Jonathan Klein

Liberty Challenge
 Date: July 1
 Location: Indianapolis Motor Speedway
 Time of Race: 35 Minutes 53 Seconds
 Average Speed: 
 Margin of Victory: 0.666 of a Second
 Pole Winner: Graham Rahal 

Top 5 Results
 Alex Lloyd
 Graham Rahal
 Jonathan Klein
 Raphael Matos
 Nick Bussell

Sun Belt Rentals 100
 Date: July 15
 Location: Nashville Superspeedway
 Time of Race: 39 Minutes 57 Seconds
 Average Speed: 
 Margin of Victory: 2.3705 Seconds
 Pole Winner: Wade Cunningham 

Top 5 Results
 Jay Howard
 Jamie Camara
 Jonathan Klein
 Tom Wood
 Wade Cunningham

Milwaukee 100
 Date: July 22
 Location: The Milwaukee Mile
 Time of Race: 46 Minutes 28 Seconds
 Average Speed: 
 Margin of Victory: 0.6614 of a Second
 Pole Winner: Wade Cunningham 

Top 5 Results
 Jamie Camara
 Wade Cunningham
 Jonathan Klein
 Bobby Wilson
 Nick Bussell

Kentucky 100
 Date: August 13
 Location: Kentucky Speedway
 Time of Race: 37 Minutes 57 Seconds
 Average Speed: 
 Margin of Victory: 0.0190 of a Second
 Pole Winner: Jonathan Klein 

Top 5 Results
 Jay Howard
 Jonathan Klein
 Wade Cunningham
 Travis Gregg
 Sean Guthrie

Carneros 100
 Date: August 26
 Location: Infineon Raceway
 Time of Race: 48 Minutes 32 Seconds
 Average Speed: 
 Margin of Victory: 0.6108 of a Second
 Pole Winner: Wade Cunningham 

Top 5 Results
 Wade Cunningham
 Alex Lloyd
 Nick Bussell
 Jonathan Klein
 Bobby Wilson

Valley of the Moon 100
 Date: August 27
 Location: Infineon Raceway
 Time of Race: 49 Minutes 3 Seconds
 Average Speed: 
 Margin of Victory: 6.2400 Seconds
 Pole Winner: Mike Potekhen

Top 5 Results
 Alex Lloyd
 Bobby Wilson
 Jonathan Klein
 Wade Cunningham
 Jay Howard

Chicagoland 100
 Date: September 9
 Location: Chicagoland Speedway
 Time of Race: 49 Minutes 9 Seconds
 Average Speed: 
 Margin of Victory: 0.6097 of a Second
 Pole Winner: Jay Howard 

Top 5 Results
 Wade Cunningham
 Jonathan Klein
 Jay Howard
 Alex Lloyd
 Chris Festa

Driver standings

 Ties in points broken by number of wins, or best finishes.

References

External links 
IndyCar official site

Indy Lights seasons
Indy Pro Series